Westport is an unincorporated community and census-designated place in Oldham County, Kentucky, United States. Its population was 268 as of the 2010 census. Westport has a post office with ZIP code 40077, which opened on November 29, 1815. The community is located along the Ohio River.

Geography

Demographics

References

Unincorporated communities in Oldham County, Kentucky
Unincorporated communities in Kentucky
Census-designated places in Oldham County, Kentucky
Census-designated places in Kentucky
Kentucky populated places on the Ohio River